Adobe Document Cloud is a service from Adobe used to store PDF files in the cloud and to access them remotely. The services supports integration with Adobe tools to fill and sign forms electronically. Adobe Scan can take pictures of documents, convert them to PDFs, and upload them to and store them in the cloud. The files can be accessed from the Webportal for Adobe Document Cloud as well as from other Adobe applications such as Adobe Acrobat Reader. The service offers both unpaid and paid options.

References 

 Official Website
 Adobe Document Cloud Portal

Cloud applications
Adobe software